Melnea Cass Boulevard station is a street-level bus station on the Washington Street branch of the MBTA Silver Line bus rapid transit service. It is located on Washington Street at Melnea Cass Boulevard in the Roxbury neighborhood of Boston, Massachusetts. The stop is served by the SL4 and SL5 Silver Line routes; a number of local MBTA bus routes stop nearby. Like all Silver Line stops, Melnea Cass Boulevard is accessible.

Silver Line service on Washington Street began on July 20, 2002, replacing the route 49 bus. Service levels doubled on October 15, 2009, with the introduction of the SL4 route.

Washington Street was a proposed stop on the Urban Ring – a circumferential bus rapid transit (BRT) line designed to connect the existing radial MBTA rail lines to reduce overcrowding in the downtown stations. Under draft plans released in 2008, buses would have run in dedicated lanes on Melnea Cass Boulevard, with platforms at Washington Street. The project was cancelled in 2010.

References

External links

MBTA: Washington St @ Melnea Cass Blvd northbound and southbound

Silver Line (MBTA) stations